Joshua Tree is a census-designated place (CDP) in San Bernardino County, California, United States. The population was 7,414 at the 2010 census. The center of the business district in Joshua Tree is on California State Route 62.

Geography

According to the United States Census Bureau, the CDP has a total land area of 95.9 km (37.0 mi2). Joshua Tree is home to Joshua Tree National Park. 
Joshua Tree shares its eastern border with Twentynine Palms, its western border with Yucca Valley, and its northwestern border with Landers; it is bordered on the south by the Coachella Valley.

Demographics

2010
At the 2010 census Joshua Tree had a population of 7,414. The racial makeup of Joshua Tree was 6,176 (83.3%) White (73.9% Non-Hispanic White), 234 (3.2%) African American, 84 (1.1%) Native American, 104 (1.4%) Asian, 18 (0.2%) Pacific Islander, 368 (5.0%) from other races, and 430 (5.8%) from two or more races. Hispanic or Latino of any race were 1,308 persons (17.6%).

The census reported that 7,263 people (98.0% of the population) lived in households, 30 (0.4%) lived in non-institutionalized group quarters, and 121 (1.6%) were institutionalized.

There were 3,088 households, 862 (27.9%) had children under the age of 18 living in them, 1,209 (39.2%) were opposite-sex married couples living together, 431 (14.0%) had a female householder with no husband present, and 162 (5.2%) had a male householder with no wife present.  There were 237 (7.7%) unmarried opposite-sex partnerships, and 30 (1.0%) same-sex married couples or partnerships. 1,018 households (33.0%) were one person and 358 (11.6%) had someone living alone who was 65 or older. The average household size was 2.35.  There were 1,802 families (58.4% of households); the average family size was 2.97.

The age distribution was 1,626 people (21.9%) under the age of 18, 813 people (11.0%) aged 18 to 24, 1,756 people (23.7%) aged 25 to 44, 2,056 people (27.7%) aged 45 to 64, and 1,163 people (15.7%) who were 65 or older.  The median age was 38.8 years. For every 100 females, there were 96.9 males.  For every 100 females age 18 and over, there were 94.3 males.

There were 3,808 housing units at an average density of 102.8 per square mile, of the occupied units 1,872 (60.6%) were owner-occupied and 1,216 (39.4%) were rented. The homeowner vacancy rate was 3.9%; the rental vacancy rate was 9.8%.  4,178 people (56.4% of the population) lived in owner-occupied housing units and 3,085 people (41.6%) lived in rental housing units.

According to the 2010 United States Census, Joshua Tree had a median household income of $39,492, with 21.8% of the population living below the federal poverty line.

2000
At the 2000 census there were 4,207 people, 1,765 households, and 1,057 families in the CDP.  The population density was 265.4/km (687.5/mi2).  There were 2,112 housing units at an average density of 133.2/km (345.1/mi2).  The racial makeup of the CDP was 86.38% White, 1.76% African American, 1.57% Native American, 1.12% Asian, 0.62% Pacific Islander, 4.61% from other races, and 3.95% from two or more races.  12.36% of the population were Hispanic or Latino of any race.
Of the 1,765 households 30.0% had children under the age of 18 living with them, 38.8% were married couples living together, 16.0% had a female householder with no husband present, and 40.1% were non-families. 33.3% of households were one person and 15.4% were one person aged 65 or older.  The average household size was 2.35 and the average family size was 2.98.

The age distribution was 27.5% under the age of 18, 7.7% from 18 to 24, 26.4% from 25 to 44, 20.1% from 45 to 64, and 18.3% 65 or older.  The median age was 37 years. For every 100 females, there were 93.9 males.  For every 100 females age 18 and over, there were 88.8 males.

The median household income was $26,535 and the median family income  was $33,333. Males had a median income of $27,465 versus $29,375 for females. The per capita income for the CDP was $13,856.  21.2% of the population and 18.0% of families were below the poverty line.   31.5% of those under the age of 18 and 5.4% of those 65 and older were living below the poverty line.

Government

Joshua Tree is represented by San Bernardino County 3rd District Supervisor James Ramos – 2012.

Attractions
The community of Joshua Tree is unincorporated and is represented by the Joshua Tree Municipal Advisory Counsel (MAC) as the official liaison between the community and the San Bernardino County government.

Notable people

Natives
People born in Joshua Tree:
Less Bells, musician
Brent Bolthouse, entrepreneur
Josh Homme (born 1973), musician
Phillip Carl Jablonski (1946-2019), serial killer

Inhabitants
People who live/lived in Joshua Tree:
Alma Allen (born 1970), sculptor
Tara Beier, singer
Marjorie Cameron (1922-1995), actress
Joey Castillo (born 1966), musician
Dave Catching (born 1961), musician
Edie Fake (born 1980), artist
Lou Harrison (1917-2003), composer
Conrad Lambert, musician known as "Merz"
Myshkin, singer
Simon Rex (born 1974), actor
Wayne Static (1965-2014), musician
John Whooley, musician
Charles M. Wysocki (1928-2002), painter
Johnette napolitano (artist/musician)

Deaths
People who died in Joshua Tree:
Charles H. Gray (1921-2008), actor
Ish Kabibble (1908-1994), comedian
Art Kunkin (1928-2019), journalist
John F. Logan (1946-2013), musician known as "Juke"
Gram Parsons (1946-1973), musician
Noah Purifoy (1917-2004), artist
Tera Wray (1982-2016), pornographic actress

Gallery

Climate

See also
 Yucca Valley, California
 Wonder Valley, California
 Pioneertown, California
 Twentynine Palms, California

References

External links

Joshua Tree: The Complete Guide
The Joshua Tree Visitors Guide

Census-designated places in San Bernardino County, California
Populated places in the Mojave Desert
Census-designated places in California